Alexis O'Hara is a Canadian transdisciplinary performer, born in Ottawa, Ontario, and currently living and working in Montreal, Quebec.

Since 1997, she has been active in the Montreal cabaret and experimental music scenes. O'Hara ran the Montreal poetry slam for several years before switching her focus to vocal and electronic music and interactive performance projects. Subject to Change and The Sorrow Sponge, two projects in which audience participation and electronic clothing are elements, have toured Canada, the United Kingdom, and Belgium. Her live and recorded work concerns itself with language, anthropomorphism, the human brain and heart, and social order.

In 2009, she began working on immersive, interactive sound installations. SQUEEEEQUE - SPEAKERDOME, a dome built entirely from recycled speaker boxes, was presented at numerous media art festivals in Europe and Canada. The work was the first acquisition to Basel's Haus der Elektronische Kunst's media art collection.

She has been described as a "a mainstay of the cabaret scene in Montreal for years", performing in her drag king persona, Guizo LaNuit. She began performing as Guizo in 2003.

Discography
 In Abulia (2002) - Grenadine Records
 Ellipsis (2010) - &records
 Le Grand Silence (2015) self-released

References

External links
 Official web site

Living people
Year of birth missing (living people)
Canadian performance artists
Women performance artists
Canadian sound artists
Women sound artists
Canadian multimedia artists
Canadian women artists
Artists from Ottawa
Artists from Montreal